is a Japanese professional footballer who plays as a goalkeeper for Ligue 1 club Strasbourg.

Kawashima played in Japan for Omiya Ardija, Nagoya Grampus Eight and Kawasaki Frontale before joining Lierse S.K. in Belgium in 2010. He then played for another Belgian club, Standard Liège, from 2012 to 2015, and Dundee United in Scotland from 2015 to 2016. He represented Japan at the 2010, 2014 and 2018 FIFA World Cups, earning over 90 caps, and was also named in the final 26-player squad for the 2022 World Cup.

Early life
Born in Yono, Saitama, Japan, Kawashima began playing football and started to playing in the goalkeeper after he idolised Sergio Goycochea and saw a video of his performance, which touched him and since played in the goalkeeper position. He then joined Yononishi Junior High School and Urawa Higashi High School.

Kawashima has an older brother and older sister.

Club career

Early career in Japan
Kawashima started his professional career at Omiya Ardija in J2 League after graduating Urawa Higashi High School. On 6 April 2002, he made his Omiya Ardija debut. He went on to make 41 appearances for the side during his three-year spell. During his time at Omiya Ardija, Kawashima went on trial at Serie A side Parma.

In 2004, Kawashima joined Nagoya Grampus Eight in Japan's J1 League. Over the three seasons, he competed with veteran goalkeeper Seigo Narazaki and served as the club's second choice goalkeeper. At times, Kawashima was given a chance of first team appearances, due to Narazaki suffered an injury. However, Kawashima himself suffered an injury concern after injuring his hand towards the end of the season and was sidelined for four weeks. He went on to make 17 appearances for the side.

Kawasaki Frontale
It was announced on 29 December 2006 that Kawasaki Frontale had signed Kawashima for a transfer fee of 150 million yen. The move was, at the time, the largest transfer fee for a player in the J.League.

Kawashima made his Kawasaki Frontale debut as a starter in a 1–0 win over Kashima Antlers in the opening game of the season, keeping a clean sheet. He then made his AFC Champions League debut, in a 3–1 win over Arema. After establishing himself as a first choice goalkeeper he soon received praises for his performances. That season, Kawasaki Frontale became the first Japanese club to qualify for the 2007 AFC Champions League where they finished first in their group. In the knockout rounds, Kawashima allowed no regulation goals in the quarterfinals against Iran's Sepahan club, but lost 5–4 in the penalty shoot-out. He also helped the side reach the final of J.League Cup, which was lost 1–0 to Gamba Osaka. At the end of the 2007 season, Kawashima had made 48 appearances (34 in the league) in all competitions.

In the 2008 season, Kawashima remained the club's first choice goalkeeper and started the opening game of the season, a 1–1 draw against Tokyo Verdy. He then kept two clean sheets on 30 March 2008 and 2 April 2008 against JEF United Chiba and Consadole Sapporo. Between 26 April 2008 and 6 May 2008, he helped the side win four league matches in a row. Kawashima then kept two consecutive clean sheets between 23 November 2008 and 29 November 2008 against Gamba Osaka and Vissel Kobe. However, Kawasaki Frontale failed to win the league, finishing as runners-up behind winners Kashima Antlers. Until the end of the 2008 season he went on to make 36 appearances (34 in the league) in all competitions.

Ahead of the 2009 season, Kawashima was named the club's senior captain. He continued as the club's first choice goalkeeper at the start of the season. He then helped the side win six league matches in a row between 10 May 2009 and 1 July 2009. Along the way, he kept three clean sheets in a row between 20 June 2009 and 1 July 2009. Following this, Kawashima was determined to help Kawasaki Frontale win the league. At the start of October, Kawashima helped the club go on a winning streak against Omiya Ardija, Kashima Antlers and Sanfrecce Hiroshima in the league keeping their fight for the title alive. However, once again, Kawasaki Frontale failed to win the league, they finished as runners-up behind winners Kashima Antlers, while losing 2–0 to FC Tokyo in the J.League Cup Final. At the end of the 2009, Kawashima was named in the J. League Best Eleven and also won the Individual Fair-Play award for the first time in his career. He made a total of 47 appearances (34 in the league) in all competitions.

Ahead of the 2010 season, Kawashima was linked with a move away from Kawasaki Frontale, but ultimately stayed at the club. He stayed as the club's first choice goalkeeper at the start of the season. Prior to an AFC Champions League match against Melbourne Victory on 31 March 2010, Kawashima suffered a hand injury in training, but made his recovery and started the whole game, as Kawasaki Frontale lost 1–0. He went on to make 17 appearances for the side in all competitions.

Lierse
After participating in the 2010 World Cup, Kawashima completed a move to Europe by joining Lierse S.K. in the Belgian Pro League. Upon joining the club, he signed a two–year contract with an option to extend. About the move Kawashima said, "After I experienced the World Cup, I thought that putting myself in a more competitive environment is the only way I can get better."

Kawashima made his Lierse debut in a 1–0 loss against Sint-Truidense in the opening game of the season. After making his Lierse debut, Kawashima quickly became the club's first choice goalkeeper. However, the club struggled at the start of the season and suffered five defeats in the first five matches, but Kawashima impressed the side with saves. On 25 September 2010, he kept his first clean in a 1–0 win over Charleroi, the side's first win in the league of the season. In mid–October, Kawashima suffered a groin injury that kept him out throughout the month. He then returned to the starting line-up on 10 November 2010, helping the side beat RFC Tournai 4–1 in the round of 16 of the Belgian Cup. Next, Kawashima went on a run of conceding a total of 24 goals in the league for the rest of 2010, as the club suffered heavy defeats, including a 7–0 loss against Standard Liège on 27 November 2010, a 3–1 loss against K.V. Kortrijk on 12 December 2010 and a 6–0 loss against Anderlecht on 26 December 2010. After helping Japan win the Asian Cup, he did not return as a starting goalkeeper on 12 February 2011 against Germinal Beerschot in a 2–2 draw. Following the 2011 Tōhoku earthquake and tsunami, Kawashima made an impressed display for the next two matches against Lokeren and Club Brugge, which saw the club secure its status in the league for the next season. In the league's Europa League Playoffs, he kept another clean sheet, in a 0–0 draw against Cercle Brugge on 2 April 2011. The club finished second place behind Cercle Brugge in the league's Europa League playoffs. At the end of the 2010–11 season, having made 30 appearances in all competitions, Kawashima won the club's player of the season award.

Ahead of the 2011–12 season, Kawashima was linked a move away from Lierse, with clubs like Fulham, West Bromwich Albion and VVV-Venlo keen on signing him. At the start of the 2011–12 season, Kawashima remained first choice goalkeeper for the side and then kept his first clean sheet in a 0–0 draw against Genk on 6 August 2011. He then managed two clean sheets between 17 September 2011 and 24 September 2011 against Cercle Brugge and Westerlo. During the 2011–12 season, he was credited by Manager Chris Janssens for giving the club the best defence. In October 2011, Kawashima was handed the captaincy taking over from Wesley Sonck and played his first match as captain on 15 October 2011, where he helped the side beat Zulte Waregem 2–1. Kawashima  again kept two clean sheets between 26 February 2012 and 3 March 2012 against Anderlecht and OH Leuven. He spent the rest of the season continuing his duties as captain. His performance at Lierse led the club begin negotiations over a new contract. At the end of the 2011–12 season, he had played all 30 regular league games and six Europa League Playoff games. Once again, Kawashima won the club's player of the season award. For his performances, he was nominated for Goalkeeper of the Year but lost out to Silvio Proto.

2011 Lierse shouting incident
On 19 August 2011, during a match between Lierse and Germinal Beerschot, which Lierse were leading 1–0, Kawashima was subjected to taunts and insults by Beerschot supporters, who chanted "Kawashima-Fukushima!" in reference to the Fukushima Daiichi nuclear disaster. After being confronted by Kawashima, the referee halted the match for several minutes until order was restored. After the match had ended in a 1–1 draw, Kawashima left the pitch in tears, visibly upset at the insults. Kawashima said, "I can pass on many things, but not that. This is not funny. Using the drama of Fukushima in this manner is not at all funny."

After the match, Beerschot released a club statement on the incident: "Our fans have crossed a thin line where a bit of fun turns into something serious. The chants aimed at Lierse goalkeeper Kawashima were offensive and completely out of order". However, Beerschot said that Kawashima was partly to blame: "The Lierse shot-stopper also took part in this as he provoked the Beerschot fans with offensive gestures and facial expressions. Our own goalkeeper Stijn Stijnen on the other hand never reacted to abusive chants and insults from the Lierse faithful." Beerschot further emphasized that it was completely unacceptable to assert insults of this nature.

Beerschot's statement caused outrage with Lierse taking the matter to the Royal Belgian Football Association (RBFA) and soon after, Beerschot posted an apology to Japan on their website. The Royal Belgian Football Association (RBFA) fined Beerschot 30,000 Swiss francs ( and ) and RBFA officials apologized not only to Kawashima, but also to Atsushi Yokota, the Japanese Ambassador to Belgium, over the incident. However, Beerschot announced their intention to appeal against their decision, based on the amount of fine they received as well as their financial problems. In the end, the Appeals Committee of the KBVB reduced the fines to €16,400 instead. However, the club were still unsatisfied with the fines and in February 2012, the Appeals Committee of the KBVB reduced the fines to €2,480 plus the legal costs.

On 22 September 2011, Beerschot formally apologized to Kawashima. Responding to Beerschot's apology, he said: "I myself have no family in the region, but I have been there visiting. People still suffer from the situation. For me, these excuses are sufficient. I also do not think supporters should be allowed to call anything anymore. They must be able to create atmosphere, but there are limits."

A year later in October 2012, French television host Laurent Ruquier made a joke about the 'Fukushima effect' and Kawashima after he showed a picture in live audience of composite picture about Kawashima with four arms. This caused outrage from Japan, who criticised Ruquier for "lacking consideration." The next day, Ruquier apologised for the joke.

When Beerschot and Lierse met again on 26 December 2011, Kawashima started the whole game, as they drew 0–0. During the match, Beerschot's supporters asked him for forgiveness through the use of banner aimed at the player.

Standard Liège
On 18 July 2012, Kawashima left Lierse to join Standard Liège on a three-year deal. The move reportedly cost Standard Liège €600,000.

Kawashima made his club debut in a 1–0 loss against Zulte Waregem in the opening game of the season. In his first match against his former club Lierse he played the whole game in a 0–0 draw and throughout the match he received standing ovations from Lierse supporters. After making his debut for the club, Kawashima quickly established himself in the first team as a starting goalkeeper. He then kept two clean sheets between 31 October 2012 and 4 November 2012 against Genk and OH Leuven, in two 2–0 victories. He again kept three clean sheets between 18 November 2012 and 2 December 2012 against Zulte Waregem, Lierse and Waasland-Beveren. He kept another three clean sheets between 16 February 2013 and 9 March 2013 against Cercle Brugge, Genk and OH Leuven. As the 2012–13 season progressed, the club became a serious contender for the title in the Championship Playoff. However, Standard Liege's two losses between 5 May 2013 and 12 May 2013 against Anderlecht and Club Brugge cost the side the league title. Kawashima started in every match throughout the 2012–13 season until he was dropped from the squad for the next two matches following his performance against Club Brugge. In a match against Gent for the Europa League spot for next season, Kawashima played in both legs, in a 7–1 win on aggregate. In his first season at Standard Liege he made 40 appearances in all competitions. For his performances, he was nominated for Goalkeeper of the Year but lost out to Silvio Proto for the second time.

Ahead of the 2013–14 season, Kawashima was linked with a move away from the club, but no bid was made. Instead, he remained a first choice goalkeeper at the start of the season. Throughout the UEFA Europa League qualifications playoffs campaign, Kawashima helped the side reach the Group Stage after beating KR, Xanthi and FC Minsk. He started the league season well keeping six clean sheets in the first six league matches. Kawashima later credited the arrival of goalkeeper coach Jos Beckx for his performance and keeping six clean sheets in the first six league matches. However, in late–October, Kawashima suffered a hip injury which made him miss three matches. He then returned from injury on 10 November 2013 against Club Brugge, keeping a clean sheet in a 0–0 draw, and amassed three more clean sheets in the following matches. Kawashima then kept five more clean sheets between 18 January 2014 and 15 February 2014. As the 2013–14 season progressed the club bcame a title contender again. However, it again did not succeed in the Championship Playoff. At the end of the 2013–14 season, Kawashima had made 47 appearances in all competitions. For his performances, Kawashima was nominated for Goalkeeper of the Year for the third time, but lost out to Mathew Ryan.

In the 2014–15 season, Kawashima helped the side beat Panathinaikos 2–1 on aggregate in the second qualification round for the UEFA Champions League. They were eventually eliminated in the playoff rounds after losing 4–0 against Zenit Saint Petersburg. He started the league season well keeping a clean sheet in a 3–0 win over Charleroi in the opening game of the season. During a 2–2 draw against K.V. Kortrijk on 2 August 2014, Kawashima made an impressive save for the side described as "world class". However, Kawashima was subject of criticism over his performances after mistakes against Feyenoord, Club Brugge and Zulte Waregem. As a result of his poor performances, Kawashima lost his first choice goalkeeper role to Yohann Thuram-Ulien and was demoted to the substitute bench. He then played twice during December against Lokeren and Feyenoord, in two losses. Despite losing his first choice goalkeeper role for the rest of the season, Kawashima finished with 19 appearances in all competitions.

At the end of the 2014–15 season, he subsequently left the club when his contract expired to pursue more first team football after losing his place to Thuram-Ulien.

Dundee United
Scottish Premiership club Dundee United applied for a UK work permit to sign Kawashima in November 2015. The signing was confirmed on 29 December, after the work permit had been approved. Upon joining the club, Kawashima was described as a "fantastic coup" by Manager Mixu Paatelainen.

He made his debut for the club against city rivals Dundee on 2 January 2016, losing 2–1. However, Kawashima's performance received criticism when he was at fault for conceding soft goals. Nevertheless, he managed to keep three clean sheets against Hamilton Academical, Ross County and St. Johnstone. However, the club were relegated after again losing 2–1 to Dundee on 2 May 2016.

At the end of the season, following the club's relegation, he was released having made 16 appearances.

Metz
On 2 August 2016, Kawashima signed for Ligue 1 side Metz.

Kawashima started the season outside the starting lineup for the first two months, appearing on the substitute bench and serving as backup to Thomas Didillon for the most of the season. On 8 January 2017 when he played the full 90 minutes against RC Lens in the first round of the Coupe de France, as the club exited the competition. He made his league debut for FC Metz in a 3–2 loss against Paris Saint-Germain on 18 April 2017. In a 1–1 draw against Toulouse on 15 May 2017 he played a vital role with his impressive saves, including saving a penalty. At the end of the 2016–17 season, Kawashima had played five league games during his maiden season in France.

Ahead of the 2017–18 season, Kawashima announced his intention to stay at Metz for another season. Kawashima started the 2017–18 season on the bench, with Didillon preferred as the first choice goalkeeper. However, following the club's first three defeats, Kawashima played his first match of the season, and made some impressive saves in a 1–0 loss against SM Caen on 26 August 2017. He was then sent off in the 50th minute for a professional foul on Adama Diakhaby in a 3–1 loss against AS Monaco on 21 January 2018. After serving a one match suspension, he returned to the starting lineup in a 2–1 win over OGC Nice on 27 January 2018. Over the next two months, Kawashima's performance earned him the club's Player of the Month award for February and March. Kawashima reassured his team with a series of excellent displays and as a result, he cemented himself as the club's number one as they fought relegation. His form for Metz earned him a recall to the Japanese national team, where he went on to reclaim the number one jersey.

Despite missing out due to injury and appearing as an unused substitute in a number of matches during the 2017–18 season, Kawashima made a total of 31 appearances in all competitions. At the end of the 2017–18 season, upon expiry of his contract, he was released by the club.

Strasbourg
In August 2018, free agent Kawashima joined Ligue 1 side RC Strasbourg on a season-long contract.

International career

Kawashima represented the Japan U20 side impressing in the AFC Youth Championship and being named Goalkeeper of the Tournament despite losing 1–0 to South Korea U20 in the final.

Kawashima was called up to the senior team for the first time in March 2007. He initially appeared as an unused substitute, including at the Asian Cup. On 17 February 2008, Kawashima made his senior debut in a 1–1 draw against North Korea. He made another appearance for the national side on 20 January 2009, in a 2–1 win over Yemen. By the end of 2009, Kawashima kept four clean sheets in three victories and one draw.

In May 2010, Kawashima was selected for the World Cup squad and was expected to serve as backup to Seigo Narazaki. In a friendly match on 30 May against England, he was the starting goalkeeper and produced many saves. He denied Frank Lampard twice, including a penalty kick, and a shot by Wayne Rooney before eventually being beaten by two own goals. Afterwards, it was announced that Kawashima was selected to be the first choice goalkeeper for the FIFA World Cup ahead of Narazaki. He played his first Group E match against Cameroon on 14 June 2010, where Japan recorded its first World Cup win on foreign soil with a score of 1–0. Five days later, on 19 June 2010 between against the Netherlands, Kawashima was the starter; he deflected a shot from Wesley Sneijder but it went in his own net as the team lost 0–1. In the match against Denmark on 24 June he allowed one goal through Jon Dahl Tomasson's penalty kick, but the team still won 3–1 and advanced to the round of 16. On 29 June, he allowed no goals against Paraguay but was unable to save a single spot-kick during the penalty shoot-out, which Paraguay won 5–3.

After the FIFA World Cup came to an end, Kawashima played two matches against Paraguay and Argentina. In December 2010, it was announced that Kawashima was selected by the national team for the 2011 Asian Cup. He played his first match of the tournament starting in a 1–1 draw against Jordan on 9 January 2011. On 13 January, however, he was sent off for causing a penalty in the group stage match against Syria, but Japan went on to win the game 2–1. After serving a one-match suspension he returned to the squad in a 3–2 win over Qatar in the quarter–final. In the semi-final against South Korea on 26 January Kawashima saved two penalty shoot-out shots to enable Japan to advance. On 29 January, Kawashima kept a clean sheet in the Final as Japan won 1–0; he was chosen as Man of the Match. After the match Kawashima spoke about winning the Asian Cup.

Following the Asian Cup tournament, Kawashima kept four consecutive clean sheets in a row against Peru, Czech Republic, South Korea and North Korea. He kept two more clean sheets against Tajikistan in both matches, both of which were victories. Between 23 May 2012 and 8 June 2012 Kawashima kept three clean sheets in a row against Azerbaijan, Oman and Jordan. Later in the year, he kept more three clean sheets in a row for the second time this year against UAE, Iraq and France.

In May 2013, Kawashima was called up by the national side for the 2013 Confederations Cup squad. He won his 48th cap for his country in a 2–1 loss against Mexico on 22 June 2013, as he went on to feature all three matches, all of them resulted in losses while Japan was eliminated from the tournament. Despite the defeat, Kawashima's performance was praised by Brazilian sports newspaper "Reims".

In May 2014, Kawashima was named in Japan's preliminary squad for the 2014 World Cup in Brazil. In the end, he made it to the final cut for the 23 man squad. Kawashima started all three matches, but was eliminated from the tournament in the group stage. He kept a clean sheet in a 0–0 draw against Greece on 20 June 2014. After the match Kawashima reflected about his time at the World Cup in Brazil, later stating that his performance against Colombia haunted him. On 14 October 2014, he captained the national side for the first time, in a 4–0 loss against Brazil.

In December 2014, Kawashima was named in Japan's squad for the Asian Cup in Australia. Kawashima started the tournament well keeping three clean sheets in the group stage matches that saw them through to the quarter–finals. However, in a match against UAE on 23 January 2015, he conceded a goal from Ali Mabkhout before Japan equalised and the match was played throughout 120 minutes; ultimately, they were eliminated after losing in penalty–shootout. Later in June, he kept two clean sheets in a row on 11 and 16 June 2015 against Iraq and Singapore.

However, after leaving Standard Liège, Kawashima was called up to the national team and lost his place to Shusaku Nishikawa and Masaaki Higashiguchi throughout the rest of 2015 and the beginning of 2016. He made his first appearance for the side in twelve months on 3 June 2016, in a 7–2 win over Bulgaria. Following this, he spent the rest of 2016 on the substitute bench, as Nishikawa was preferred as the starting goalkeeper instead. On his return as a starting goalkeeper against UAE, he kept the two clean sheets in the process in the World Cup qualification Asia.

In May 2018, Kawashima was named in Japan's preliminary squad for the World Cup in Russia. Eventually, he made it to the final cut of the 23 men squad. After being selected for the World Cup, Kawashima started as the first choice goalkeeper for the side and helped the side beat Colombia 2–1 on the matchday 1 of the group stage. His performance against Colombia earned him the lowest rating by Web Gekisaka. In a 2–2 draw against Senegal, Kawashima was at fault when he attempted to clear the ball, only for Sadio Mané to score. Despite the criticism, Manager Akira Nishino gave confidence in Kawashima and gave him the captaincy against Poland. Throughout the match, Kawashima captained the side, making many saves, though he conceded a goal from Jan Bednarek, which saw Japan lose 1–0. Due to receiving fewer yellow cards than Senegal Japan qualified to the knockout stage, becoming the only Asian team to do so in the 2018 World Cup. In the Round of 16 against Belgium, Japan were eliminated from the tournament after losing 3–2 despite Kawashima's fine performance. While receiving criticism for his performance, Kawashima was placed third place for number of saves in the World Cup, according to Opta Sports.

In 2019, he made it to the final cut of the 23 men Copa América's squad. He was part of 2022 FIFA World Cup. He announced his retirement from the national team in 15th December 2022.

Style of play
At Lierse, Kawashima received praise from the club. CEO Neil De Kewler said of him: "The movement within the goal is quick, the processing of the ball on the line is skillful, furthermore, the player with the leadership that can lead the defense line", while technical director Root Kelzer said: "I can not think of any bad points about him, I will not have anyone who dislikes him, He is a very professional athlete, seriously and disciplinedly open for everyone, every time he looks up, he asks for a handshake with a friendly smile, not only as a player but also as an individual."

Prior to signing for Dundee United, Manager Mixu Paatelainen said about him: "As for Eiji, he is quality. He is very agile and quick. He commands and is a leader behind the defence. He talks a lot and sometime demands better action from the defenders."

Personal life

As a member of Japan's national team, Kawashima helped develop a program to improve the foreign language skills of Japanese athletes and coaches who play and coach internationally. Outside of football, he was also involved in helping children with disabilities.

In addition to his native Japanese, Kawashima speaks English, Dutch, French, Italian, Portuguese and Spanish. He was quoted saying about the importance of languages: "It is difficult if the keeper cannot speak, I cannot argue with myself." In addition to football, he's a fan of fashion. Kawashima revealed that he wears contact lenses when he's on the pitch.

In December 2008, Kawashima signed for an agency with Tetsuro Kiyooka, a FIFA Players' Agent (Sports agent), in hopes of moving to Europe. It worked when he joined Lierse two years later after signing for Tetsuro Kiyooka. In September 2014, he revealed on his blog that he was married. He said he met his wife four years ago and began dating three years later before getting married. In December 2015,  Kawashima revealed on his blog that he was father for the first time when his wife gave birth to a son named Kensei.

In October 2010, Kawashima signed a sponsorship with Samantha Thavasa. He was featured in June 2012 cover of Ermenegildo Zegna magazine. Outside of football, Kawashima is considered very popular in his native country Japan. During a 1–1 draw against Genk on 18 December 2010, at least 500 Japanese Kawashima's supporters visited Herman Vanderpoortenstadion to watch him play.

Career statistics

Club

International

Honours

Japan
 AFC Asian Cup: 2011

Individual
 J.League Best Eleven: 2009
 J.League Individual Fair-Play Award: 2009

References

External links

  
 
 
 
 

Living people
1983 births
Association football people from Saitama Prefecture
Association football goalkeepers
Japanese footballers
Japan youth international footballers
Japan under-20 international footballers
Japan international footballers
J1 League players
J2 League players
Belgian Pro League players
Scottish Professional Football League players
Ligue 1 players
Omiya Ardija players
Nagoya Grampus players
Kawasaki Frontale players
Lierse S.K. players
Standard Liège players
Dundee United F.C. players
FC Metz players
RC Strasbourg Alsace players
2007 AFC Asian Cup players
2010 FIFA World Cup players
2011 AFC Asian Cup players
2013 FIFA Confederations Cup players
2014 FIFA World Cup players
2015 AFC Asian Cup players
2018 FIFA World Cup players
2019 Copa América players
2022 FIFA World Cup players
AFC Asian Cup-winning players
Japanese expatriate footballers
Japanese expatriate sportspeople in Belgium
Expatriate footballers in Belgium
Japanese expatriate sportspeople in Scotland
Expatriate footballers in Scotland
Japanese expatriate sportspeople in France
Expatriate footballers in France